Taha Najmuddin is the second son of Mufaddal Saifuddin, the 53rd Da'i al-Mutlaq of the Dawoodi Bohras and the grandson of Mohammed Burhanuddin. He is an Arabic scholar at Al Jamea tus Saifiyah and heads a number of socio-economic institutions of the Dawoodi Bohra community.

Early life  

Taha Najmuddin was born on 28 March 1975 in Mumbai, India. His primary education took place in Saifee Mahal, Mumbai under personal tutelage of his grandfather, Mohammed Burhanuddin and his father, Mufaddal Saifuddin. He attended MSB Educational Institute and graduated as Al-Faqih al-Jayyid (MA) in Islamic Fatemi Literature from Aljamea-tus-Saifiyah in 1996. He completed the memorization of the Quran in 1999 and is also a professor at Al Jamea tus Saifiyah.

Career 
Taha Najmuddin regularly accompanies Mufaddal Saifuddin on his travels and oversees various socio-economic initiatives of the Dawoodi Bohra community. He administers the following departments:
 Sigah al-Yemen (President): Management of the affairs of community members in Yemen.
 SBUT Saifee Burhani Upliftment Trust (Vice-Chairman, 2014) - Bhendi Bazaar redevelopment project.
 Anjuman e Shiate Ali (Vice President)  - Managing the affairs of Dawoodi Bohra of Mumbai.
 FMB - Faiz ul Mawaid al Burhaniyah - A global food initiative serving daily meals to community members and cutting down on food wastage.
 MSB - Al Madrasa tus Saifiya tul Burhaniyah  - Community schools worldwide.
 Sigah al-KUN (President)  - Pilgrimages to Najaf & Karbala. 
 Upliftment & Fostership Programme - A biannual campaign and outreach program which sees volunteers travel to cities and villages across South Asia and East Africa in order to uplift and foster critically low-income families within the community.

Najmuddin is also a signatory of the Amman Message along with his brother Ja'far us Sadiq Imaduddin.

Recognition and awards 

 : On 15 May 2015 (27 Rajab 1436 Hijri) - he was given the cognomen "Najmuddin" by Syedna Mufaddal Saifuddin.
 : He was conferred two of the highest degrees of Aljamea-tus-Saifiyah; "Thiqah al-Da'wah al-Taiybiyyah" (translation: The trusted of the Taiyebi Da'wah) and the degree of "al-'Aleem al-Baare' " (Translation: The Outstandingly Learned) on 3 May 2016 (27 Rajab 1437 Hijri).

References

1975 births
Living people
21st-century Muslim scholars of Islam
Dawoodi Bohras